Han Dong-Jin (born August 25, 1979) is a South Korean footballer. He currently plays for Jeju United.

Club career statistics

External links
 

1979 births
Living people
Association football goalkeepers
South Korean footballers
Jeju United FC players
Gimcheon Sangmu FC players
K League 1 players
People from Wonju
Sangji University alumni
Sportspeople from Gangwon Province, South Korea